100 najboljih pesama svih vremena YU rocka (Top 100 Yugoslav Rock Songs of All Times) was a list compiled by the Serbian music magazine Rock Express. In 1999, Rock Express started the poll for the selection of top 100 Yugoslav rock songs. The whole list was published in the 25th issue of Rock Express, in 2000. The list contains rock music songs from Socialist Federal Republic of Yugoslavia and the songs from successor states.

The list

Voting
Every voter chose five songs, each of them receiving a vote.

Audience
More than 3400 readers took a part in the poll. Readers from FR Yugoslavia and other SFR Yugoslavia successor states, as well as from other countries took a part in the poll.

Journalists
120 journalists and music critics from FR Yugoslav media took a part in the poll.

Musicians
100 musicians took a part in the poll. Although the names of the musicians were not stated, it was stated that former and current members of Riblja Čorba, Bijelo Dugme, Smak, YU Grupa, Leb i Sol, Vatreni Poljubac, Indijanci, Zbogom Brus Li, Čovek Bez Sluha, Atheist Rap, Kerber, Prljavi Inspektor Blaža i Kljunovi, Sunshine, Oktobar 1864, Goblini, Lutajuća Srca, Novembar, Galija, Siluete and other bands voted.

Statistics

Bands with the most songs
8 Bijelo Dugme
7 Smak
6 Riblja Čorba
6 Azra
5 Ekatarina Velika
5 Time
4 Partibrejkers
4 YU Grupa
4 Parni Valjak
4 Prljavo Kazalište

Bands by the number of songs that appeared in the voting
23 Riblja Čorba (6 of them on the list)
19 Smak (7 of them on the list)
18 Bijelo Dugme (8 of them on the list)
16 Azra (6 of them on the list)
16 Ekatarina Velika (5 of them on the list)
12 Leb i Sol (3 of them on the list)
10 Partibrejkers (4 of them on the list)
8 Van Gogh (3 of them on the list)
7 KUD Idijoti (0 of them on the list)
6 Time (5 of them on the list)
6 Sunshine (0 of them on the list)
5 Indexi (3 of them on the list)
5 Zabranjeno Pušenje (2 of them on the list)
5 Korni Grupa (2 of them on the list)
5 Film (2 of them on the list)
5 Šarlo Akrobata (2 of them on the list)
5 Bajaga i Instruktori (1 of them on the list)
5 Kerber (1 of them on the list)

References

See also
YU 100: najbolji albumi jugoslovenske rok i pop muzike
Kako (ni)je propao rokenrol u Srbiji
B92 Top 100 Domestic Songs

Lists of rated songs
Yugoslav rock music
Serbian rock music